Liophis is a former genus of New World colubrid snakes. They have a wide range of nondescript and local names, among these "water snakes", "mapepires", "corals" or "racers".

Taxonomy and systematics
The status of the genus Liophis on the mainland of South America is highly uncertain, and some authorities assign some species to the genera Dromicus, Erythrolamprus, Leimadophis, Lygophis, and Philodryas. Others consider Dromicus and Leimadophis to be synonyms of Liophis.

References

Further reading
Wagler J (1830). Natürliches System der Amphibien, mit vorangehender Classification des Säugthiere und Vögel. Ein Beitrag zur vergleichenden Zoologie. Munich, Stuttgart and Tübingen: J.G. Cotta. vi + 354 pp. + one plate. (Liophis, new genus, pp. 187–188). (in German and Latin).

 
Taxa named by Johann Georg Wagler